Hoornsterzwaag is a small village in Heerenveen in the province of Friesland, the Netherlands. It had a population of around 830 in January 2017.

History
The village was first mentioned in 1408 as Suage, and means "cattle field belonging to Oudehorne". The church dates from 1621 and was extensively restored in 1856. The current bell tower dates from 2007. In 1840, Hoornsterzwaag was home to 151 people.

Before 1934, Hoornsterzwaag was part of the Schoterland municipality.

Gallery

References

External links

Populated places in Friesland
Heerenveen